A Kingdom Besieged is a fantasy novel by American writer by Raymond E. Feist,  the first book in the trilogy The Chaoswar Saga, the final saga in The Riftwar Cycle.  The novel was announced by Feist on February 27, 2008, and was released on April 12, 2011.

References

2011 American novels
2011 fantasy novels
Novels by Raymond E. Feist
HarperCollins books